Tjiuee Uanivi (born 31 December 1990) is a Namibian rugby union player that normally plays as a lock or flanker. He currently plays for US Montauban in the ProD2.

Early life 
Uanivi was born in Otijwarongo and grew up in Windhoek. He first picked up a rugby ball whilst attending Pioneerspark Primary school before moving on to Academia High School where he was more interested in football than rugby, but picked it up again after school and joined United Rugby Club. He studied at the University of Namibia.

Rugby Union career

Amateur career

When not involved with the Glasgow Warriors, Uanivi played for the Glasgow Hawks.

Professional career

Whilst playing for the Namibian tertiary institutes rugby team at the 2013 World Student Games he was spotted by a coach from Top14 side Brive who offered him a place at the club's academy. He debuted against Toulon in the same year and continued to play for them until 2015 having been offered a professional contract in his second season.  After the 2015 Rugby World Cup, he moved to South Africa to join the; he was also included in the  squad for the 2016 Super Rugby season.

Uanivi made his debut for the Warriors in the pre-season match against Harlequins on 20 August 2016.

On 4 May 2017 it was announced that Uanivi would leave the Warriors at the end of the season. He played 5 times for the Glasgow club.

On 13 July 2017 it was announced that Uanivi had signed for London Scottish.

He left London Scottish after the 2018/19 season to join RC Massy in the Federale 1. He spent two seasons with the French third division club.

On 9 March 2021 it was announced that Uanivi had signed for French ProD2 side US Montauban for the 2021/22 season.

International career

He made his debut for Namibia in 2014 against Germany, and was a member of their 2015 Rugby World Cup squad. He was selected for the 2019 Rugby World Cup and was selected to start all four games, captaining the team against eventual winners South Africa and Italy.

References

1990 births
Living people
CA Brive players
Rugby union flankers
Rugby union locks
Namibian rugby union players
Namibia international rugby union players
People from Otjiwarongo
Glasgow Warriors players
Glasgow Hawks players
London Scottish F.C. players
US Montauban players